Yamtuan, also known officially as Yang di-Pertuan Besar and unofficially as Grand Ruler, is the royal title of the ruler of the Malaysian state of Negeri Sembilan. The Grand Ruler of Negeri Sembilan is elected by a council of ruling chiefs in the state, or the Undangs. This royal practice has been followed since 1773. The Yamtuan Besar is elected from among the four leading princes of Negeri Sembilan (Putera Yang Empat); the Undangs themselves cannot stand for election and their choice of a ruler is limited to a male Muslim who is Malay and also a "lawfully begotten descendant of Raja Radin ibni Raja Lenggang", the 4th Yamtuan.

This unique form of government later inspired the first Prime Minister of Malaysia, Tunku Abdul Rahman, to implement a form of rotational constitutional monarchy for a newly independent Federation of Malaya (now Malaysia). Thus, the office of Yang di-Pertuan Agong was created.

Early history

Early history covers the period from the first settlements in the region up until its formation into a single recognised state.

Negeri Sembilan has been receiving migrants from Sumatra for hundreds of years. Prior to the implementation of this unique form of monarchy, the area was ruled by the Sultan of Malacca. After Malacca was defeated by the Portuguese, it was ruled by the Sultanate of Johor.

Even during the 18th century, several groups of Minang people had expanded to the Malay peninsula especially around the areas of Rembau, Naning and Sungai Ujong but retained strong links to their homeland in Sumatra. During this period, Rembau was under the nominal authority of Johor, until 1758 when it was ceded to the Dutch.

By 1760, however, Johor which was having trouble from the Dutch, decided to allow the state to find a leader from the Minangkabau people in Sumatra. Between 1760 and 1770, a council of leaders known as the penghulu luak (the predecessor of the Undangs today) left for Pagar Ruyung in Minangkabau in search of a leader. Popular belief held that the legendary Raja Melewar was elected in 1773 as the first ruler of Negeri Sembilan.

Middle history

Middle history covers the period when Negeri Sembilan was treated as a part of the Minangkabau region and its ruler was appointed by the Pagaruyung palace in West Sumatra.

YamTuan Melewar
The council of Sultan Malenggang Alam of Pagaruyung appointed his uncle, Raja Mahmud (Rajo Mangiang), to rule this new outpost of the Minangkabau region. Raja Mahmud was grandson of Sultan Alif II of Pagaruyung. He later became known as Raja Melewar upon ascension to the Negeri Sembilan throne. 

Prior to Raja Melewar, the districts were separately vying for power against each other while a greater problem of interference, incursions and invasion loomed over them from Bugis controlled Johor and Selangor. All this amid the stream of imposters claiming the throne, including Raja Kasah, Raja 'Adil and Raja Khatib.

Raja Melewar is credited with the successful unification the main districts and numerous outlying settlements into a cohesive political state we now know as Negeri Sembilan. He was installed as the first Yang diPertuan Besar Negeri Sembilan at Penajis in Rembau with the endorsement of all the territorial chiefs. He ruled as YamTuan from 1775 until his death in 1795.

YamTuan Hitam
Following the death of Raja Melewar in 1795, the same council of leaders once again set out on a journey to their ancestral land. By this time, Negeri Sembilan had risen in importance in the Minangkabau region. In 1795, the council of Sultan Muning Syah III of Pagaruyung appointed his uncle, Raja Hitam (Rajo Samik II), as Yamtuan Besar. Raja Hitam was son of Sultan Bagagar Syah I of Pagaruyung. Following the Minangkabau matrilineal tradition, Raja Hitam married Raja Melewar's daughter, Tunku Aishah, but they had no children. As a diplomatic gesture, Raja Hitam also married the widow of the brother of Sultan Ibrahim of Selangor; begetting 4 children, including a daughter, Tunku Ngah. He died in 1808.

YamTuan Lenggang
Once again in 1808, the leaders of Negri Sembilan went to Minangkabau in search of someone to replace their leader. At this time, the Minangkabau Confederacy was in the middle of the Padri War against religious militant extremists promoting Wahabbism. The council of Sultan Bagagar Syah III (Sultan Tangkal Alam Bagagar & MuningSyah V) of Pagar Ruyung appointed his uncle, Raja (Ali) Lenggang Laut. Raja Lenggang was the son of Sultan Malenggang Alam of Pagaruyung. YamTuan Lenggang established the royal residence at the town of Seri Menanti. He wedded Raja Hitam's second daughter, Tunku Ngah. They had two sons: Tunku Radin and Tunku Imam. YamTuan Lenggang died in 1824.

End of the Dynasty in Minangkabau West Sumatra 
In 1824, the Undangs could not embark on a trip to meet the Raja of Pagar Ruyong because, by then, the Pagaruyung Dynasty was mostly destroyed. During the Padri War, a truce meeting with the Minangkabau royal family in 1815 was in reality a planned mass murder of the royal family by a Wahabbi leader, Tuan Ku Lintau. The Dutch military forces took possession of Minangkabau territories in 1821. Thus, for the first time in its history, Negri Sembilan would have its own hereditary leader to continue the Pagaruyung Dynasty.

Late history

Late history covers the period of flux; after the fall of the Pagaruyung dynasty in West Sumatra and before the Constitutional era.

YamTuan Radin
As the Pagaruyung Kingdom was in tatters in West Sumatra, YamTuan Lenggang looked to continue the dynasty with what was left in Negeri Sembilan. He proposed his young son, Raja Radin (Raden), to be the next YamTuan but the district Undangs were hesitant. 

After he died, there were 5 claimants to the throne: (1) the swashbuckler Raja Kerjan (proxy for Sungai Ujong chief), (2) the dubious Raja Sati (Laboh) sent from Siak (also proxy for Sungai Ujong), (3) the braggard Raja Ali, nephew of Sultan Ibrahim of Selangor (4) the youthful Raja Radin, and (5) the unknown Raja Beringin but suddenly self-appointed guardian of Radin. Raja Beringin was largely ignored; while Raja Sati bickered against his benefactor and was removed. In 1832, the Negri chiefs vehemently objected when Raja Ali declared himself YamTuan and his son-in-law, Sayid Sha'ban as YamTuan-Muda. Ali & Sha'ban went to war with the Linggi chief and attempted the murder of the Undang of Rembau. The Negeri chiefs abandoned their machinations, rallied around Raja Radin, elected him to the Seri Menanti throne and went to war against Ali & Sha'ban. Raja Ali was driven out; Sha'ban eventually became the chief of Tampin; while Raja Kerjan was later killed by the Temenggong of Muar for stealing buffaloes. 

With the appointment of YamTuan Radin, the blood line to the Minangkabau Pagaruyung dynasty remained unbroken. YamTuan Radin ruled for 30 years before he died in 1861. He had  2 sons, Tunku Antah and Tunku Lintau.

YamTuan Imam
After the death of YamTuan Radin, his son Tunku Antah was quite young and after some consternation among the Negeri chiefs, they appointed Raja Imam as YamTuan in 1861. YamTuan Imam ruled for eight years and died in 1869. He had a son, Tunku Ahmad Tunggal.

YamTuan Antah
Upon the death of Yamtuan Imam, the 2 claimants to the throne were  Tunku Antah and Tunku Ahmad Tunggal. With no consensus forthcoming, Datuk Siamang Gagap elevated the widow of YamTuan Radin, Tuanku Puan Intan as the Regent from 1869 to 1872. 

The Undang of Johol supported Tunku Antah; the Undang of Sungai Ujong was backing Tunku Ahmad Tunggal; the Undang of Jelebu was undecided with their own problems; the Undang of Rembau wanted their own independence. After 3 years of wrangling, Tunku  Antah was elected as Yamtuan in 1875.

During this time, the British administration was attempting to obtain border treaties and commercial agreements with all the states and districts in the Malay peninsula. The Undang of Sungai Ujong signed with the British but without any reference to the ruler nor the other Undangs. This eventually culminated into the 1876 Battle of Bukit Putus wherein the united forces of Negeri Sembilan attacked the British protecting Sungai Ujong. Yamtuan Antah's forces were eventually defeated by British infantry and artillery. YamTuan Antah surrendered to the British in Johor and was demoted to "YamTuan Seri Menanti" but he was still determined to obtain an equitable agreement for the entire State. At the urging of the Sultan of Johor, the Governor of the Straits Settlements agreed to reconcile the dispute between Sungai Ujong and the other districts. Suggestions to the British from the Undang of Sungai Ujong amongst others was the installation of a new Sultan (from Muar) and appointing Tunku Ahmad Tunggal as "Malay Captain" for all territories except Sungai Ujong. By 1877, every district and territory in Negeri Sembilan had separate agreements with the British which included arbitration by the Sultan of Johor; but this proved unworkable. In 1887, witnessed by the British Governor of the Straits Settlements, a new agreement was signed by the chiefs of Johol, Inas, Ulu Muar, Jempol, Terachi and Gunung Pasir. Through this agreement, they acknowledge and ratify YamTuan Antah as Yamtuan Sri Menanti; the ruler of the Sri Menanti Confederacy.

YamTuan Antah died in 1888, a victim of a smallpox epidemic. In 1889, the districts of Rembau and Tampin joined the Confederacy to bear the historic name of the Nine States - Negeri Sembilan.

Modern history

Tuanku Muhammad
In 1888, the son of Yamtuan Antah, Tuanku Muhammad Shah at the age of 22 years took on the title of Tuanku and was declared Yang diPertuan Besar of the Sri Menanti Confederacy. With the final 2 districts joining, on 29 April 1898, he was installed as the Yang diPertuan Besar of Negeri Sembilan. This marks the formal adoption of a State Constitution wherein the chiefs of territories of Jelebu, Johol, Sungai Ujong and Rembau are officially elevated in status of Undang; and the YamTuan would exercise control over the districts of Gunung Pasir, Inas, Jempol, Terachi & Ulu Muar. Tuanku Muhammad died in 1933.

Tuanku Abdul Rahman
Tuanku Muhammad's son, Tuanku Abdul Rahman, took over in 1933. Tuanku Abdul Rahman later became the first Yang di-Pertuan Agong of Malaya in 1957 (during which time his brother Tunku Laksamana Nasir was regent).

Tuanku Munawir
Tuanku Abdul Rahman's son, Tuanku Munawir, ascended the throne in 1960 and ruled until 1967.

Tuanku Ja'afar
When Tuanku Munawir died, his brother, Tuanku Ja'afar Tuanku Abdul Rahman, became the ruler of Negri Sembilan, by-passing Munawir's son Muhriz of Negeri Sembilan, who at 19 years of age was a minor. Tuanku Jaafar also served as the tenth Yang di-Pertuan Agong of Malaysia. During this period, Negeri Sembilan was ruled by the regent, Y.A.M. Tunku Laxamana Tunku Naquiyuddin.

Tuanku Muhriz
On the death of Tuanku Jaafar in 2008, the Undangs elected Tuanku Muhriz (eldest son of Tuanku Munawir and nephew of Tuanku Jaafar).

Election of Yang Di Pertuan Besar
Negeri Sembilan follows the Minangkabau tradition of selecting its Ruler through a consensus of the noble chiefs. For Negeri Sembilan, the State Constitution assigns the choice of successor of the YamTuan to the 4 Undangs (chiefs). 

Extract from "The Laws of the Constitution of Negeri Sembilan, 1959":-

Chapter 3 : THE YANG DI-PERTUAN BESAR

VII. (1) There shall be a Yang di-Pertuan Besar of the State to exercise the functions and powers of a Ruler in accordance with this Constitution and who shall take precedence over all other persons in the State.

(2) The Yang di-Pertuan Besar shall be such person as shall be elected by the Undangs of the territories of Sungai Ujong, Jelebu, Johol and Rembau in the manner hereinafter provided and in accordance with the custom of the State.

(3) No person shall be elected as Yang di-Pertuan Besar of the State unless He shall be a male of the Malay race, of sound mind and professing the religion of the State, who is a lawfully-begotten descendant in the male line of Raja Radin ibni Raja Lenggang.

(4) Upon the death of a Yang di-Pertuan Besar, leaving male issue him surviving, the Undangs of the territories of Sungai Ujong, Jelebu, Johol and Rembau shall forthwith choose a successor from the said male issue:

 Provided that if, in the opinion of the said Undangs, there is no suitable and competent person among the said male issue, then a person shall be chosen from the first of the following classes or failing, in their opinion any suitable and competent person in that class, then from the second and subsequent classes in the order stated, that is to say–      

 Firstly, the brothers of the deceased Yang di-Pertuan Besar;
 Secondly, the paternal uncles of the deceased Yang di-Pertuan Besar;
 Thirdly, the grandsons of the deceased Yang di-Pertuan Besar;
 Fourthly, the sons of the brothers of the deceased Yang di-Pertuan Besar;
 Fifthly, the sons of the paternal uncles of the deceased Yang di-Pertuan Besar.

List of Yamtuan

Pagaruyung Dynasty
1773–1795: Raja Melewar – The 1st Yamtuan of Negeri Sembilan (died 1795)
1795–1808: Raja Hitam – The 2nd Yamtuan of Negeri Sembilan (died 1808)
1808–1824: Raja Lenggang – The 3rd Yamtuan of Negeri Sembilan (died 1824)
1824–1861: Yamtuan Radin – The 4th Yamtuan of Negeri Sembilan (died 1861)
1861–1869: Yamtuan Imam – The 5th Yamtuan of Negeri Sembilan (died 1869)
1869–1872: Tengku Ampuan Intan (female regent)
1875–1888: Tuanku Antah ibni Almarhum Yamtuan Radin – The 6th Yamtuan of Negeri Sembilan/Sri Menanti (died 1888)
1888–1933: Tuanku Muhammad Shah ibni Almarhum Tuanku Antah – The 7th Yang di-Pertuan Besar of Sri Menanti/Negeri Sembilan (died 1933)
1933–1960: Tuanku Abdul Rahman ibni Almarhum Tuanku Muhammad – The 8th Yang di-Pertuan Besar Negeri Sembilan and 1st Yang di-Pertuan Agong (died 1960)
1960–1967: Tuanku Munawir ibni Almarhum Tuanku Abdul Rahman – The 9th Yang di-Pertuan Besar Negeri Sembilan (died 1967)
1967–2008: Tuanku Ja'afar ibni Almarhum Tuanku Abdul Rahman – The 10th Yang di-Pertuan Besar Negeri Sembilan and 10th Yang di-Pertuan Agong (died 2008)
2008–present: Tuanku Muhriz ibni Almarhum Tuanku Munawir – The 11th Yang di-Pertuan Besar Negeri Sembilan

See also 
 Elective monarchy
 Monarchies of Malaysia
 Family tree of Negeri Sembilan monarchs
 Family tree of Malaysian monarchs

References

Further reading 
 Information from Warisan Diraja Negri Sembilan Darul Khusus
 History behind Negri's unique selection of ruler, The New Straits Times, 29 December 2008.
 The Nĕgri Sĕmbilan: Their Origin and Constitution by M. Lister - 1887, Volume 19, Journal of the Straits Branch of the Royal Asiatic Society (Great Britain & Ireland).
 Rĕmbau by D.F.A. Hervey - 1884, Volume 13, Journal of the Straits Branch of the Royal Asiatic Society (Great Britain & Ireland).
 Negri Sembilan - The History, Polity and Beliefs of the Nine States by R. O. Winstedt C.M.G., D.Litt. (Oxon), General Adviser, Johore - 1933, Volume 11, Journal Of The Malayan Branch Of The Royal Asiatic Society

 
.
Feudalism in Malaysia
History of Negeri Sembilan
Malaysian nobility
Monarchs of Malaysia
Noble titles of Malaysia
1773 establishments in Asia
1773 establishments in the British Empire
1770s establishments in Southeast Asia
Malaysian people of Minangkabau descent
Minangkabau people